Faye Montana (born September 6, 2003) is a German actress, video producer and presenter.

Life 
Faye Montana's parents are the actress Anne-Sophie Briest and the late rapper Markus Oergel ("Big Sal"), founding member of the hip-hop group Harleckinz. Montana operates a YouTube channel with approximately 340,000 subscribers. On April 7, 2017, Faye released her first single, titled Numbers. Shortly after, on April 21, the track appeared on the YouTube channel Digster Pop. The song reached over 6 million views on YouTube by August 2021.

In July 2017, mvg Verlag published the 2017-2018 student calendar by Faye Montana.

Filmography 

 2009: Zweiohrküken (Rabbit Without Ears 2)
 2010: Inga Lindström – episode Prinzessin des Herzens (Princess of the Heart)
 2013: Polizeiruf 110 (Police Call 110) – episode Fischerkrieg
 2016: Kreuzfahrt ins Glück (Cruise to Happiness) – episode Hochzeitsreise an die Loire (Honeymoon to the Loire)
 2016: Brief an mein Leben (Letter to My Life)
 2017: Hanni & Nanni: Mehr als beste Freunde (Hanni & Nanni: More Than Best Friends)

Discography 

 2017: Numbers (music video)
 2018: Der beste Tag in Trolls: Die Party geht weiter! (Dreamworks Trolls: The Beat Goes On!)
 2018: Red (cover)
 2018: Wie ich bin (How I Am) (for the film Liliane Susewind (Little Miss Dolittle))
 2019: Sue me (cover)
 2019: New version of the German theme song from Miraculous – Geschichten von Ladybug und Cat Noir
 2020: Heather (cover)
 2020: Someday at Christmas (cover)
 2021: Rock Me Down (music video)

Presenter 

 2015–2016: Das Spiel beginnt! (The Game Begins!)

Publications 

 Die Freundinnen-Challenge (The Girlfriend Challenge), co-authored with Emma Schweiger in 2019. ISBN 978-3961290949

References

External links 
 

21st-century German actresses
German television actresses
German YouTubers
2003 births
Living people